The 2016 MLS SuperDraft was the seventeenth SuperDraft conducted by Major League Soccer. The SuperDraft is held each year in conjunction with the annual National Soccer Coaches Association of America convention. The 2016 convention was held in Baltimore, Maryland. The first two rounds of the 2016 SuperDraft were held on January 14, 2016. Rounds three and four were held via conference call on January 19, 2016.

Format
The SuperDraft format has remained constant throughout its history and closely resembles that of the NFL Draft:

Any expansion teams receive the first picks.
Non-playoff clubs receive the next picks in reverse order of prior season finish.
Teams that made the MLS Cup Playoffs are then ordered by which round of the playoffs they are eliminated.
The winners of the MLS Cup are given the last selection, and the losers the penultimate selection.

Player selection

Round 1 
Any player marked with a * is part of the Generation Adidas program.

Round 1 trades

Round 2

Round 2 trades

Round 3

Round 3 trades

Round 4

Round 4 trades

Other 2016 SuperDraft Trade Notes
 On June 6, 2013, Vancouver Whitecaps FC acquired a conditional selection in the 2016 SuperDraft and a second-round selection in the 2015 SuperDraft from D.C. United in exchange for defender Alain Rochat. The conditions to trigger the 2016 SuperDraft pick were not met.
 On January 6, 2015, Colorado Rapids received goalkeeper Zac MacMath on loan for the 2015 season from Philadelphia Union. The loan deal included a provision that Philadelphia would acquire a first-round selection in the 2016 SuperDraft from Colorado should Colorado execute a permanent transfer for MacMath at the end of the 2015 season. On November 5, 2015, Colorado announced it would not exercise the transfer option on MacMath.

Notable undrafted players

Homegrown players

Other notable players

Summary

Selections by college athletic conference

Schools with multiple draft selections

Selections by position

References

Major League Soccer drafts
SuperDraft
MLS SuperDraft
2010s in Baltimore
Soccer in Baltimore
Events in Baltimore
MLS SuperDraft